The 32nd Annual Nickelodeon Kids' Choice Awards ceremony was held on March 23, 2019, at the Galen Center in Los Angeles, California with DJ Khaled serving as host. It aired live on Nickelodeon, and was broadcast live or tape delayed across all of Nickelodeon's international networks. 

The ceremony, which featured JoJo Siwa as a correspondent alongside Khaled throughout the show, included performances from Migos and the cast of SpongeBob SquarePants: The Musical.

Two series starring Jace Norman were the lead-in and lead-out around the ceremony. A new episode of Henry Danger led into the ceremony, while a sneak peek of the "A-block" of the first episode of The Substitute slotted in between the KCAs and the lead-out (a rerun of the same Henry Danger episode that led into the ceremony).

Appearances 
Prior to the ceremony, Annie LeBlanc and Jayden Bartels hosted an Orange Carpet livestream across Nickelodeon's social media accounts, which included a performance from Ally Brooke.

The ceremony featured appearances by celebrities including Asher Angel, Paris Berelc, Ally Brooke, Noah Centineo, Lana Condor, Eugenio Derbez, David Dobrik, Riele Downs, Ariana Grande, Jack Dylan Grazer, Owen Joyner, Joey King, Liza Koshy, Zachary Levi, Lilimar, Mena Massoud, Caleb McLaughlin, Isabela Moner, Jace Norman, Josh Peck, Daniella Perkins, Chris Pratt, Adam Sandler, Naomi Scott, Kiernan Shipka, Lilly Singh, JoJo Siwa, Will Smith, Scarlet Spencer, Jason Sudeikis, Ryan ToysReview, and Dallas Dupree Young.

Performers

Winners and nominees 
The nominees were announced and voting opened on February 26, 2019. Voting ended on March 22, 2019. The winners are listed first, highlighted in boldfaced text.

Movies

Television

Music

Miscellaneous

International 

The following are nominations for awards from Nickelodeon's international networks, have the categories and awards presented during continuity during their individual airings of the main American ceremony.

References

External links 
  (archived)
 

Kids' Choice
Kids' Choice Awards
Kids' Choice Awards
March 2019 events in the United States
Nickelodeon Kids' Choice Awards
Television shows directed by Glenn Weiss